Asclepiodorus  or Asclepiodoros may refer to:

Asclepiodorus (painter)
Asclepiodorus of Macedon, son of Timander, was one of the generals of Alexander the Great